Thierry Joseph-Louis Escaich (born 8 May 1965) is a French organist and composer.

Life 
Born in Nogent-sur-Marne, Escaich studied organ, improvisation and composition at the Conservatoire de Paris (CNSMDP), where he won eight First Prizes and where he has taught improvisation and composition since 1992.

Together with Vincent Warnier, he was appointed organist of Saint-Étienne-du-Mont church in Paris in 1996 (succeeding Maurice Duruflé). He tours internationally as a performing artist and composer.

His passion for the cinema has led him to improvise on the piano and the organ; he composed music for Frank Borzage's silent film Seventh Heaven, commissioned by the Louvre in 1999.

To date he has written more than a hundred works, awarded with the Prix des Lycéens (2002), the Grand Prix de la Musique symphonique from the SACEM in 2004, and on three occasions, in 2003, 2006 and 2011, the French Victoires de la Musique Composer of the Year award.

Although he composes for the organ (solo pieces, chamber music, two concertos, La Barque solaire [The Sun Boat] for organ and orchestra), Escaich is open to all genres, forms and instruments (piano, saxophone...)

He wrote a ballet for the New York City Ballet, The Lost Dancer, which was world-premiered in New York City in May 2010 under the title Why am I not where you are (choreography by Benjamin Millepied, scenic designs by Santiago Calatrava).

After being composer in residence with the Orchestre national de Lille, the Orchestre de Bretagne and the Orchestre National de Lyon, he will take up his position as associated composer with the Ensemble Orchestral de Paris in September 2011.

His music is performed by orchestras such as the Philadelphia Orchestra, the Berlin Konzerthaus Orchestra, the Mariinsky Theatre Orchestra or the Orchestre de Paris, by choirs such as Radio France Choir, the BBC Singers,  and by musicians such as Christoph Eschenbach, Lothar Zagrosek, Jun Märkl, Claire-Marie Le Guay, Paul Meyer, Gautier and Renaud Capuçon, Olivier Latry, Iveta Apkalna, David Grimal, Nora Gubisch, John Mark Ainsley, the Trio Dali, the Trio Wanderer and the Quatuor Voce.

Discography 
 "Orgues d'Ile-de-France/Volume 1 Marie-Claire Alain at Saint-Germain-en-Laye Toccata (A. Alain) Deuils, Variations on a theme of C.J, Litanies (J.Alain) – Thierry Escaich at Mantes-la-Jolie Symphonie Improvisee sur le nom d'ALAIN (Prelude, Scherzo, Adgietto, Final), Laudes part 4 (Eben) Cinq versets sur Victimae Paschali (Escaich) Chamade CHCD5620 (19950
 Le Chemin de la Croix, improvisations (texts by Paul Claudel), Thierry Escaich (organ), Georges Wilson (speaker), recorded at Laon cathedral, Calliope, 2000.
 Trumpet & Organ: Bizet, Franck, Purcell, Bach, Mozart, Tomasi, Gounod, Spiritual, Christmas Medley. Éric Aubier (trumpet), Thierry Escaich (organ). Indésens/Sony Classical, 2000.
 Œuvres pour orgue et voix, Thierry Escaich (organ), Ensemble vocal Soli Tutti, Éric Aubier (trumpet), recorded at Saint-Étienne-du-Mont Church, Paris, Calliope, 2001.
 Concerto pour orgue – Première Symphonie – Fantaisie concertante, Olivier Latry (organ), Claire-Marie Le Guay (piano), Orchestre philharmonique de Liège, cond. Pascal Rophé. Accord/Universal, 2002. Diapason d'Or of the Year award.
 Le Dernier Evangile – Trois danses improvisées, Ensemble orchestral de Paris, Maîtrise de Notre-Dame de Paris, Choeur Britten, Olivier Latry (organ), cond. John Nelson, recorded at Notre-Dame de Paris. Éditions Hortus, 2002.
Concerts au grand orgue de Saint-Étienne-du-Mont" Including live performances by Daniel Roth, Vincent Warnier and Marie-Claire Alain. Intrada 2004 (Mendelssohn Sonata No. 3, Andante & Scherzo Improvisés, Naïades (Louis Vierne) Improvisation sur un theme donné All performed by Thierry Escaich)
Concerts au grand orgue de Saint-Étienne-du-Mont 2eme édition 2004–2005 Including live performances by Yves Castagnet, Marie-Claire Alain and Vincent Warnier. Thierry Escaich: Ouverture-Improvisation and Improvisation
 Exultet, vocal works, Ensemble Sequenza 9.3, cond. Catherine Simonpietri, Accord/Universal, 2006
 Miroir d'ombres, for violin, cello and orchestra [1] – Vertiges de la Croix [2] – Chaconne [3], Renaud Capuçon (violin), Gautier Capuçon (cello), Orchestre national de Lille, cond. Paul Polivnik [1], Michiyoshi Inoue [2], Jean-Claude Casadesus [3]. Label: Accord/Universal, 2007. Monde de la Musique magazine's Choc de l'année award.
 Organ Spectacular, improvisations à l'orgue (concert recordings), 2 CD Accord, 2008.
 Lettres mêlées autour de Thierry Escaich, chamber music: Bartók, Debussy, Martinu, Escaich (Lettres mêlées + Scènes d'enfants au crépuscule). Emmanuel Pahud (flute) – François Leleux (oboe) – Paul Meyer (clarinet) – Trio Wanderer. Label: Accord/Universal, 2009.
 Musique française pour instruments à vent, Quintette Aquilon: Escaich (Instants fugitifs), Tomasi, Ibert, Françaix. Label Premiers Horizons (distr. Codaex), 2009.
 Étranges étrangers – Guidoni chante Prévert, songs on poems by Jacques Prévert, sung by Jean Guidoni. Two songs by Thierry Escaich: Maintenant j'ai grandi and Elle disait. Label: Edito Musique, 2009.
 Tanz-Fantasie, French music for organ and trmpet. Eric Aubier (trumpet) and Thierry Escaich (organ, Saint-Étienne-du-Mont, Paris) – Escaich, Bacri, Tomasi, Jolivet, + 5 improvisations. Label Indésens (distr. Codaex) INDE012, 2009.
 Les Nuits hallucinées. La Barque solaire, Les Nuits hallucinées, Violin Concerto. Thierry Escaich (organ), Nora Gubisch (mezzo-soprano), David Grimal (violin), Orchestre national de Lyon, cond. Jun Märkl, Christian Arming. Accord/Universal, 2011. Classica magazine's Choc award.
 Concertos for Orchestra by Zhou Tian, Thierry Escaich & Sebastian Currier. Includes Escaich's Concerto for Orchestra (Symphony 2), recorded live, May 2016. Cincinnati Symphony Orchestra, cond. Louis Langrée. CSO Fanfare Cincinnati, 2016.
 Baroque Song. Baroque Song pour orchestre, Concerto pour clarinette et orchestre, Erinnerung, pour orchestre a cordes, Suite symphonique de "Claude". Paul Meyer (clarinet), Orchestre De L'Opera National de Lyon, cond. Alexandre Bloch. Sony Classical, 2017.
Camille Saint-Saëns, Organ Symphony No. 3, Thierry Escaich, organ, Orchestre Philharmonique Royal de Liège, conducted by Jean-Jacques Kantorow. SACD Bis 2021. Diapason d'or

Compositions

Symphonic music 
 Symphony No. 1 (« Kyrie d'une messe imaginaire ») (1992)
 Chaconne for large orchestra (2000)
 Intrada (2003)
 Vertiges de la croix, symphonic poem (2004)
 Baroque Song, for small orchestra (2007)
 Symphonic Suite from the opera Claude (2014)
 Concerto for Orchestra (Symphony No. 2) (2015)

String orchestra 
 Émergence (1988)
 Erinnerung (2009)
 Symphonic Prelude (2012)

Concertos 
 Le Chant des ténèbres (1992) for soprano saxophone and strings
 Le Chant des ténèbres (1992) for soprano saxophone and 12 saxophones
 Organ Concerto No. 1, for organ and symphony orchestra (1995)
 Fantaisia concertante for piano and orchestra (1995)
 Elegy for trumpet and instrumental ensemble (1996)
 Résurgences, Concerto for trumpet and orchestra (2002)
 Miroir d'ombres (Mirror of Shadows), Double Concerto for violin, cello and orchestra (2006)
 Organ Concerto No. 2, for organ, string orchestra and two percussionists (2006)
 La Barque solaire, symphonic poem for orchestra and principal organ (2008)
 Le Chant des ténèbres, version for clarinet and strings (2008)
 Violin Concerto (2009)
 Fantastic Scherzo for two pianos and orchestra (2011)
 Clarinet Concerto (2012)
 Cello Concerto (2014)
 Concerto for violin, oboe and orchestra (2014)
 Organ Concerto No. 3 ("Quatre Visages du temps"), for organ and orchestra (2017)
 Le Nuit des Chants, Concerto for viola and orchestra (2018)
 Etudes symphoniques, Concerto for piano and orchestra (2023)

Solo organ 
  Trois Esquisses (1990)
 Cinq Versets sur le « Victimæ paschali »  (1991)
 Quatrième Esquisse (« Le Cri des abîmes ») (1993)
 Récit (1995)
 Deux Évocations (1996)
 Poèmes (2002)
 Agnus Dei (2003)
 Évocation III (2008)

Other solo instruments 
 Les Litanies de l'ombre (1990) – piano
 Lutte (1994) – saxophone
 Jeux de doubles (2001) – piano
 Nun komm (2001) – violin
 Aria (2002) – piano
 Cantus I (2005) – cello
 Deux Études baroques (2009) – piano

Chamber music (2–6 instruments) 
 Trois Intermezzi (1990) for flute, clarinet and saxophone
 Comme l'écho d'une fantaisie (1992) for 2 cornetts and organ (without pedal)
 Introït à l'Office des ténèbres (1992) for flute and blue harp (or piano)
 Psalmodie à l'Office des ténèbres (1992) for flute, blue harp and percussion
 Scènes d'enfants au crépuscule (1993) for flute, cello and piano
 Trio américain (« Suppliques ») (1994) pour clarinet, alto and piano
 Trois Instants fugitifs (1994) for flute, oboe, clarinet, horn and bassoon
 Variations gothiques (1996) for flute and string trio
 Nocturne (1997) for cello and piano
 Tanz-Fantasie (1997) for trumpet and piano
 Ground I (avant 1998) for accordion and euphonium
 Chorus (1998) for clarinet, string quartet and piano
 La Ronde (2000) for string quartet and piano
 Tanz-Fantasie (2000) for trumpet and organ
 Choral's Dream (2001) for piano and organ
 Scènes de bal (2001) for string quartet
 Spring's Dance (2001) for 2 pianos and percussion
 Le Bal (2003) for 4 saxophones
 Lettres mêlées (2003) for violin, cello and piano
 Après l'aurore (2005) for string quartet
 Una storia (2005) for violin, alto, cello, clarinet, percussions and piano
 Mechanic Song (2006) for wind quintet and piano
 Ground II (2007) for organ and percussions
 Ground III (2008) for 4 cellos
 Phantasia antiqua (2009) for 2 saxophones and piano

Ensemble (7 instruments and more) 
 Antiennes oubliées (1989) for violin, cello, flute, saxophone in E b, trumpet, trombone and percussion
 Rhapsodie (1989) for clarinet, bassoon, cornet, trombone, violin, double bass and percussion.
 Magic Circus (2004) for wind octet
 Fanfare (2006) for brass ensemble

A cappella vocal and choral music 
 Ad ultimas laudes (1993)
 Les Lamentations (du prophète Jérémie) (1998)
 Alléluias (2001)
 Dixit Dominus (2002)
 Sanctus (2007)
 Vocis cælestis (2009)

Vocal and choral music with instrument(s) 
 Grande Messe solennelle (1994)
 Trois Motets (1998)
 Le Dernier Évangile (1999)
 D'une douleur muette (2001)
 Terra desolata (2001)
 In memoriam (2002)
 Visions nocturnes (2004) for mezzo-soprano, clarinet, string quartet and piano
 Exultet (2005)
 Feu vert (2005)
 Valse désarticulée (2008) for soprano and saxophone
 Les Nuits hallucinées (2008) for mezzo-soprano and orchestra
 Madre (2010) for soprano and piano
 Alléluias pro omni tempore (2010)
 Guernesey (2010), for tenor and piano (poems by Victor Hugo)

Stage works 
 The Lost Dancer (2010), ballet
 Claude (2012/2013), libretto written by Robert Badinter
 Point-d'Orgue (2021), libretto written by Olivier Py

Songs 
 "Elle disait..." (2008)
 "Maintenant, j'ai grandi" (2008)

Movies 
 Seventh Heaven (1999), music for the silent movies by Frank Borzage for clarinet, violin, alto, cello, piano and percussions

Pedagogical works 
 Choral varié (en hommage à Jean-Sébastien Bach) (1984) for junior orchestra
 Suite en forme de choral varié (1990) for junior orchestra
 Tango virtuoso (1991) for 4 saxophones
 Énigme (1992) for double bass and piano
 Huit Pièces (1993) for saxophone and piano
 Amélie's Dream (1997) for saxophone en mi b and piano
 Variations-Études (2002) for piano
 Tango virtuoso (2005) for 4 clarinets
 Sax Trip (2006) for alto saxophone and junior string orchestra
 Étude-Passacaille (2009) for piano

References

External links

Profile, Gérard Billaudot, Escaich's musical publisher

1965 births
Living people
20th-century classical composers
20th-century French composers
20th-century French male musicians
21st-century classical composers
21st-century French composers
21st-century organists
21st-century French male musicians
French classical composers
French male classical composers
French classical organists
French male organists
French ballet composers
Academic staff of the Conservatoire de Paris
Conservatoire de Paris alumni
People from Nogent-sur-Marne
Male classical organists